The Tomb of Louis XII and Anne of Brittany is a large and complex silver-gilt and marble sculptured 16th century funerary monument. Its design and build are usually attributed to the Juste brothers although the work of several other hands can be distinguished. Designed for and installed at the Saint-Denis Basilica, France, it was commissioned in 1515 in memory of Louis XII (d. 1515, aged 52) and his queen Anne of Brittany (d. 1514, aged 36), probably by Louis' successor Francis I (reigned 1515–1547), and after years of design and intensive building was unveiled in 1531.

The tomb's monumentality breaks from traditional medieval representations, and is influenced by classical sources, especially Roman, probably borrowed from Andrea Sansovino and contemporary Florentine sculptors. The art historian Barbara Hochstetler Meyer describes it as portraying the deceased "with a verism, poignancy, and sensitivity to nature rarely equalled in the north of Europe during the sixteenth century."

Description

Louis is shown in the interior as a gaunt, rotting and naked recumbent cadaver, his head resting on a stone pillow. His death mask is a remarkably realistic depiction of the recently dead: his eyes are sunken into his skull, his skin is taut, his neck is especially emaciated, and his hair is very thin.

The stone slab above the tomb shows both alive and in full flesh. Louis and Anne are depicted kneeling beside with their hands clasped in prayer. Unusually, the king is not wearing a crown. He had suffered prolonged illness before his death, and the impact of this is made evident by his sagging skin and decrepit muscles. Nor is his age shied away from; he has a long curved nose, beady and alert but swollen eyes, and a double chin.

The arches of the tomb contains a number of groupings of seated figures, including apostles and figures representing the seven cardinal virtues. Beyond them, at each corner are four larger, also seated, female figures.

Gallery

Notes

Sources

 Cohen, Kathleen. Metamorphosis of a Death Symbol: The Transi Tomb in the Late Middle Ages and the Renaissance. University of California Press, 1973.  
 Cohen, Kathleen. The Changing Meaning of the Transi Tomb in Fifteenth and Sixteenth Century Europe. University of California Press, 1968
 Dupont, Jacques. "A Portrait of Louis XII Attributed to Jean Perréal". The Burlington Magazine for Connoisseurs. Volume 89, No. 534, 1947
 Giese, Francine; Pawlak, Anna; Thome, Markus (eds). Tomb – Memory – Space: Concepts of Representation in Premodern Christian and Islamic Art, Walter de Gruyter, 2018
 Jugie, Sophie. The Mourners: Tomb Sculpture from the Court of Burgundy . Paris: 1; First Edition, 2010. 
 Hochstetler Meyer, Barbara.  Journal of the Walters Art Gallery, volume 40, 1982 

1510s sculptures
1520s sculptures
Cadaver tomb
Funerary art
Sculptures in France
Tombs in France